Asia-Africa-Europe 1 (AAE-1) is a 25,000 km submarine communications cable system from South East Asia to Europe across Egypt, connecting Hong Kong, Vietnam, Cambodia, Malaysia, Singapore, Thailand, Myanmar, India, Pakistan, Oman, UAE, Qatar, Yemen, Djibouti, Saudi Arabia, Egypt, Greece, Italy, and France. The AAE-1 cable has capacity of at least 40 terabits per second (Tbit/s) to supply the broadband market across Asia, Africa and Europe. In July 2017, it was launched for commercial services and is the longest submarine cable system in over a decade.

Organization and owners
China Unicom initiated the AAE-1 cable project in 2011, with the support and partnership from Telecom Egypt. The AAE-1 consortium, which obtained the construction and maintenance contract in 2014, consists of over 17 carriers, including British Telecom, China Unicom, Djibouti Telecom, Etisalat, Global Transit, HyalRoute, Jio, Metfone, Mobily, Omantel, Ooredoo, Oteglobe, PCCW Global, PTCL, Retelit, Telecom Egypt, TeleYemen, TOT, VNPT, Viettel.

References

Submarine communications cables
Jio
2017 establishments in Africa
2017 establishments in Asia
2017 establishments in Europe
Submarine communications cables in the Pacific Ocean
Submarine communications cables in the Indian Ocean
Submarine communications cables in the Arabian Sea
Submarine communications cables in the Red Sea
Submarine communications cables in the Mediterranean Sea
Telecommunications in India
2017 establishments in India